Elections were held in the state of New South Wales, Australia, on Saturday 19 September 1981. The result was a second "Wranslide": a landslide victory for the Labor Party under Neville Wran. Labor increased its already sizeable majority, winning what is still its biggest-ever share of seats in the New South Wales Legislative Assembly–69 out of 99 seats, 69.7 percent of the chamber.

The Liberals suffered the double indignity of losing the seat contested by their leader Bruce McDonald to an independent, and of being reduced to the same number of seats in parliament as their ostensible junior coalition partner, the National Country Party. In fact it was the second election in a row in which the sitting Liberal leader had failed to win a seat; Peter Coleman had been rolled in his own seat in 1978.  Both the Liberals and National Country Party finished with 14 seats.

The election marked another milestone for electoral reform in New South Wales. The allocation of preferences became optional, and partisan gerrymandering was eliminated. Additionally, the practice of creating smaller rural seats to boost country representation was ended. Two further reforms were proposed—and passed—in referendums put to voters on the same day.
 
Ted Mack, mayor of North Sydney Council, won the seat of North Shore from Opposition Leader McDonald. John Hatton was re-elected unopposed in the seat of South Coast.

Key dates

Results

Legislative Assembly

{{Australian elections/Title row
| table style = float:right;clear:right;margin-left:1em;
| title        = New South Wales state election, 19 September 1981
| house        = Legislative Assembly
| series       = New South Wales state election
| back         = 1978
| forward      = 1984
| enrolled     = 3,178,225
| total_votes  = 2,897,033
| turnout %    = 91.15
| turnout chg  = –1.62
| informal     = 89,306
| informal %   = 3.08
| informal chg = +0.80
}}
	

|}

{{bar box|float=right|title=Popular vote|titlebar=#ddd|width=600px|barwidth=410px|bars=

}}

Legislative Council

{{Australian elections/Title row
| table style = float:right;clear:right;margin-left:1em;
| title        = New South Wales state election, 19 September 1981
| house        = Legislative Council
| staggered    = yes
| enrolled     = 3,212,657
| total_votes  = 2,927,971
| turnout %    = 91.14
| turnout chg  = –1.63
| informal     = 200,367
| informal %   = 6.84
| informal chg = +2.79
}}
	

|}

Seats changing hands

Members listed in italics did not recontest their seats.
In addition, the National Country held the seat of Murray, which it won from the Liberals in the 1980 by-election.

Redistribution affected seats

 Sitting MP for Clarence Matt Singleton instead contested the new seat of Coffs Harbour and won.

Post-election pendulum

See also
Candidates of the 1981 New South Wales state election

Notes

References

Elections in New South Wales
1981 elections in Australia
1980s in New South Wales
September 1981 events in Australia